Shannon Miller (born November 17, 1963) served as the head coach of the Minnesota–Duluth Bulldogs women's ice hockey team from 1999 to 2015. In addition, she was the head coach of the Canadian national women's hockey team which claimed gold at the 1997 IIHF World Women's Championships, along with the silver medal in ice hockey at the 1998 Winter Olympics.

Playing career
Miller played in the first Canadian national championships in 1982. Miller also refereed Canadian university hockey from 1982 to 1985. In 1985, she was a member of the Canadian Hockey Feminine Council and was president of the Southern Alberta Women’s Hockey League. She helped to form the first ever girls minor hockey association in Calgary in 1989.

Coaching career
She was an assistant coach for Team Alberta at the 1991 Canada Winter Games. In June 2011, Miller was named the coaching mentor for the Russian senior national team in preparation for the 2014 Winter Olympics in Sochi, Russia.

Hockey Canada
In addition, she was an assistant coach for Team Canada at the 1992 and 1994 Women’s World Ice Hockey championships.

Minnesota Duluth
On April 20, 1998, Miller was hired as the first head coach for the Minnesota–Duluth Bulldogs women's ice hockey team. On March 22, 2010, Duluth mayor Don Ness declared Friday, March 26, 2010 as "Shannon Miller Day'" in Duluth. She is the most successful NCAA women's hockey coach in Frozen Four tournament wins (11) and NCAA Division I national championships (five). She reached her 250th and 300th career wins faster than any other head coach in NCAA Division I history. She is the third best Division I coach in wins and just one of two Division I coaches to reach the 200-win mark in eight seasons.

Heading into the 2011–12 Minnesota–Duluth Bulldogs women's ice hockey season, Miller was chair of the Ethics Committee for US women's college hockey. In addition, she was a member of the NCAA Division 1 Championships Committee, one of only two coaches in the entire country to serve on both committees.

On October 5, 2013, Miller became the 3rd coach in NCAA history to reach 350 career wins after a 6–1 win over the University of Connecticut at Amsoil Arena. 
Miller's contract was not renewed beyond the 2014–15 season as part of an effort by the school to close a $4.5 million budget deficit.

Discrimination lawsuit against UMD

In September 2015, Miller and two other former UMD coaches, softball coach Jen Banford (whose contract also had not been renewed) and basketball coach Annette Wiles (who had resigned in June 2015 due to an alleged hostile work environment), filed suit against the University of Minnesota Board of Regents, alleging discrimination based on gender, sexual orientation, age and national origin, and that UMD created a hostile work environment, violated equal pay laws and violated Title IX of the United States Education Amendments of 1972, which prohibits sexual discrimination in education programs receiving federal financial assistance.

The trial began March 6, 2018 at the federal courthouse in Duluth, MN. On March 15, the jury found the university guilty of sex discrimination and retaliation and awarded Miller $3.74 million ($744,832 in past lost wages and $3 million in past emotional distress.) No award was made for future emotional distress and the judge was to determine any award for future lost wages.

In December 2019 University of Minnesota-Duluth officials finalized a settlement with Miller totalling $4,530,157, with a payment of $2,102,939 to Miller, and $2,427,218 to her attorneys.

CWHL
On June 23, 2018, Miller signed a contract to become the head coach for the Calgary Inferno of the CWHL. She left after only 12 games and a 10–1–1 record while in first place in the league claiming a difference of opinion with the general manager.

Coaching record

Minnesota Duluth

Awards and honors
Petro Canada Coaching Excellence Award
2000 WCHA Coach of the Year
In 2003, Miller was part of the Bulldogs coaching staff that was named American Association of College Coaches' women's hockey coaching staff of the year.
2003 AHCA Coach of the Year
YWCA's Woman of Distinction 2010 Award (celebrates women's leadership)

Personal
Miller hails from Melfort, Saskatchewan. On May 2, 2012 at the federal courthouse in St. Paul, Minnesota, Miller became a United States citizen and now holds dual Canadian/American citizenship.

References

1963 births
Canadian emigrants to the United States
Canadian expatriate ice hockey people in the United States
Canadian ice hockey coaches
Canadian police officers
Canadian women police officers
Ice hockey people from Saskatchewan
Lesbian sportswomen
LGBT ice hockey players
Canadian LGBT sportspeople
Living people
Medalists at the 1998 Winter Olympics
Minnesota Duluth Bulldogs women's ice hockey
Olympic silver medalists for Canada
People from Melfort, Saskatchewan
University of Saskatchewan alumni
Minnesota Duluth Bulldogs women's ice hockey coaches